Heukseongsan is a mountain located in Cheonan, South Chungcheong Province, South Korea.

See also
Geography of South Korea
List of mountains in Korea
List of mountains by elevation
Mountain portal
South Korea portal

References

Cheonan
Mountains of South Chungcheong Province
Mountains of South Korea